The Struggle is a Trotskyist, Leftist organization in Pakistan which was found in Netherlands by Lal Khan and other Pakistani activists. The group follows the ideology of Karl Marx, Friedrich Engels, Vladimir Lenin and Leon Trotsky.

Formation 
The seeds of the Marxist politics was planted in 1980 in Netherlands, when a number of leftist Pakistani activists who had fled Pakistan to escape Zia’s repression found themselves in Amsterdam in the cold November 1980. The country was ruled by the notorious General Zia.

In November 1980, the Struggle group decided to start a monthly Urdu magazine called Jidd-o-jehed or The Struggle۔ The Struggle magazine soon developed a cult status among the Pakistani diaspora, and poets like Habib Jalib, Ahmad Faraz and Faiz Ahmed Faiz started contributing to the magazine by writing revolutionary and anti-dictatorship Urdu poems for the magazine. In December 1984, the magazine published a poem Main Baaghi Hoon, written by Khalid Javaid Jan. The poem became a staple in popular culture due to its revolutionary tone and was used in underground protests as a weapon against Dictator Zia.

The Struggle group continued their activism in exile against military dictatorship in Pakistan and went on to organise a mass funeral for Zulfikar Ali Bhutto in front of the Pakistani embassy in Holland with nearly 500 participants. The charged environment also saw participants throw stones at the embassy’s windows and Farooq was briefly arrested by Dutch police. Arrests, activism and attempts by Pakistani authorities to get them arrested made them popular with leftist and progressive movements in Europe. They campaigned on worker issues, against racism, immigrant issues and anti-nuclearisation with local left parties. The group was also in contact with the Committee for a Workers International (CWI), a Trotskyist “international.”

Pakistan base 
In 1986, the Struggle group started working from Pakistani soil. The Struggle followed a strategy known as Entryism, a theory that small militant groups should join mainstream workers’ parties in order to pull them to the left. The strategy is employed in an attempt to expand influence and was advocated by Trotsky.

In early 1990s, the Committee for a Workers International (CWI) split in two over the question of Entryism. Peter Taaffe, a prominent member of English section of the CWI advocated an “Open Turn,” implying the building of an independent organization and an end to “Entryism”. Whereas, another faction led by Ted Grant wanted to maintain its “entrist” strategy. The Struggle also suffered the split and Farooq Tariq, along with perhaps one dozen Struggle members, followed Peter Taaffe’s lead and went on to build an independent political party for workers in Pakistan. The other faction, led by Lal Khan, continued with its "entryism" inside the Pakistan People’s Party (PPP). According to this theory a small militant groups should join mainstream workers’ parties in order to pull them to the left. The strategy is employed in an attempt to expand influence and was advocated by Trotsky. In 2016 Lal Khan is expelled from International Marxist Tendency over differences on entryism inside the Pakistan People's Party.

Current Work 

Lal Khan continued to be the editor of the Struggle magazine and leader of the Struggle group. He also wrote articles regularly for the Daily Times and Dunya. Khan criticized the partition of India and advocated for Indian reunification through a common revolution, which he said would heal continuing wounds and solve the Kashmir conflict. His views are described his book published by The Struggle, "Crisis in the Indian Subcontinent, Partition: Can it be Undone?" in which Khan stated that "revolutionary transformation of the economies and societies is an essential prerequisite for the reunification of the subcontinent." After death of Mr Khan, they had their successful 38th annual Congress at Lahore and vowed to carry our revolutionary work.

The Struggle group has their own publication agency and has published numerous books and leaflets on topics including Marxist ideology, history of Marxist struggle in Pakistan, and various books covering history of Bolshevik revolution. Some of the books are: Partition – Can it be undone?, Pakistan's Other Story – The Revolution of 1968–69, and Kashmir, A revolutionary way out. Books in Urdu language include, whereas translated publications from other language into Urdu include. On centenary of Russian revolution; a 1,200-page translation of Leon Trotsky’s classic work, History of the Russian Revolution has been published into Urdu language by The Struggle group.

The Struggle's trade union front is known as Pakistan Trade Union Defence Campaign (PTUDC), and multiple other fronts working among Youth, including Unemployed Youth Movement. In 2015, youth and students fronts of the Struggle started a campaign to bring together prominent left-wing students and youth organizations from across the country on a single platform. It holds its regularly its congress which are held to analyse the performance of The Struggle and to formulate new strategies for social change and revolution. In March 2013, Malala Yousafzai sent solidarity message to The Struggle congress.

Recently, in 2018 Pakistani general election its prominent leader Ali Wazir has been elected as member of National Assembly of Pakistan.

References

External links 
 http://struggle.pk



Far-left politics in Pakistan
Labour history of Pakistan
Pakistani diaspora in Europe
Organizations established in 1980
Political advocacy groups in the Netherlands
Socialist parties in Pakistan
Socialist parties in the Netherlands
Trotskyism in Pakistan
Trotskyist organizations in Asia
Trotskyist organizations in Europe